Danish national cycle route 5, known as the Østkystruten (East Coast Route), is the fifth of the 11 Danish National Cycle Routes. It runs from Sønderborg  in Southern Jutland to Skagen, the northernmost tip of Jutland in the Northern Jutland region.

Towns on the route

See also
Danish National Cycle Routes

External links
Website of Vejdirektoratet - the Danish Road Directorate
CykelGuide – National cycle routes in Denmark  (pdf file)

Cycleways in Denmark
Transport in Aarhus
Transport in the Region of Southern Denmark
Transport in the Central Denmark Region
Transport in the North Jutland Region